Ariel Román Soto González (born 14 May 1992) is a Costa Rican professional footballer who plays as a defender for Liga FPD club Herediano.

International career
He made his debut for Costa Rica national football team on 13 October 2020 in a friendly against Panama. He played the full game.

Honors 
LD Alajuelense
 Costa Rican Primera División (2): 2012–13 Invierno, 2013–14 Invierno.

References

External links 
 

1992 births
Living people
Costa Rican footballers
Costa Rica international footballers
Costa Rican expatriate footballers
Brujas FC players
L.D. Alajuelense footballers
Boyacá Chicó F.C. footballers
C.F. Universidad de Costa Rica footballers
A.D. Carmelita footballers
C.S. Herediano footballers
Liga FPD players
Categoría Primera A players
Footballers from San José, Costa Rica
Association football defenders
Costa Rican expatriate sportspeople in Colombia
Expatriate footballers in Colombia
Costa Rica under-20 international footballers
Costa Rica youth international footballers